Dunya Mikhail (born 1965 in Baghdad, Iraq) is an Iraqi-American poet based in the United States.

Life
She was born and raised in Iraq to a Chaldean-Catholic family. She graduated with a BA from the University of Baghdad.

Mikhail worked as a journalist, as editor of the literary section, and as a translator for The Baghdad Observer. As a liberal writer during the time of dictatorship and censorship, Mikhail fled Iraq in 1995, going first to Jordan and then eventually to the United States, where she became a U.S. citizen, got married, and raised a daughter. She studied Near Eastern Studies and received her MA from Wayne State University.

In 2001, she was awarded the United Nations Human Rights Award for Freedom of Writing.

Mikhail speaks and writes in Arabic and English. Her works include the poetry collection The War Works Hard, which won PEN's Translation Fund award, was shortlisted for the Griffin Poetry Prize, and was named one of the best books of 2005 by the New York Public Library. Her genre-bending work Diary of a Wave Outside the Sea won the Arab American Book Award in 2010. Her poetry has appeared in Poetry International, Modern Poetry in Translation, the London Times, as well as anthologies including World Beat: International Poetry Now from New Directions, Flowers of Flame: Unheard Voices of Iraq, and Iraqi Poetry Today: Modern Poetry in Translation.

Mikhail's honors include the Guggenheim Fellowship, the Knights Foundation grant, the Kresge Fellowship, the United Nations Human Rights Award for Freedom of Writing, and the shortlist of the Arabic Booker Prize. She is the co-founder of the Michigan community-based Mesopotamian Forum for Art and Culture. She currently works as a special lecturer of Arabic at Oakland University in Michigan.

Bibliography
  (shortlisted for the 2006 International Griffin Poetry Prize)
 
The Iraqi Nights, Translated by Kareem James Abu-Zeid, New Directions Publishing Corporation, 2014,  
 The Theory of Absence, Chinese University Press, 2014, 
 The Beekeeper: Rescuing the Stolen Women of Iraq, translated by Max Weiss and Dunya Mikhail. New Directions Publishing Corporation. 2018. .
 In Her Feminine Sign. New Directions Publishing Corporation. 2019.
 The Bird Tattoo. Dar al-Rafidain. 2020.

References

External links
 Official Web site
 Dunya Mikhail interview in Guernica Magazine
 Griffin Poetry Prize biography

 Dunya Mikhail profile on Words Without Borders Web site
 Dunya Mikhail interview and reading on National Public Radio (NPR)

1965 births
Living people
Wayne State University alumni
21st-century Iraqi poets
Eastern Catholic poets
Iraqi writers
Iraqi women writers
Writers from Baghdad
American writers of Iraqi descent
American poets
Chaldean Catholics
American women poets
Iraqi emigrants to the United States
21st-century American poets
20th-century Iraqi poets
American Arabic-language poets
21st-century American women writers
American Chaldeans